Max William James Harwood (born 12 September 1997) is an English actor. He debuted in the titular role of the film Everybody's Talking About Jamie (2021), an adaptation of the stage musical based on a true story. He was named a 2021 Brit to Watch by Variety.

Early life
Harwood was born and raised in Basingstoke. He attended Bishop Challoner Catholic Secondary School     and then Queen Mary's College for sixth form where he took A Levels in theatre studies, art photography, music technology and history. He took a year-long foundation course at the Guildford School of Acting on a scholarship before going on to graduate from the Urdang Academy in London.

Filmography

Awards and nominations

References

External links

Living people
1997 births
21st-century English male actors
English gay actors
Male actors from Hampshire
People educated at Bishop Challoner School
People from Basingstoke